Babelomurex benoiti is a species of sea snail, a marine gastropod mollusc in the family Muricidae, the murex snails or rock snails.

Description
Its shell is white-yellowish with many small ridges. The shell is normally 20mm – 45mm in length, the mean being around 38mm.

Distribution
The species occurs in the Eastern Mediterranean Sea, off the coasts of Sardinia, Greece and Turkey.

References

 Tiberi, N., 1855 Descrizione di alcuni nuovi testaceivivrnti nel Mediterraneo, p. 16 pp

External links
 Encyclopedia of Life – Babelomurex benoiti
 GBIF – Babelomurex benoiti

benoiti
Gastropods described in 1855
Molluscs of the Mediterranean Sea
Gastropods of Europe